John Richard Wolfe (1832-1915) was an Irish missionary serving with the Church Missionary Society in Fuzhou, China from 1862 to 1915.

Biography 
Wolfe was born in 1832 near Skibbereen, County Cork, Ireland, which at that time was part of Great Britain.  

He entered the Church Missionary Society College, Islington, London in 1857. In 1861 he was ordained a deacon at St Paul's Cathedral and in December of that year he sailed for Hong Kong from where he was assigned as a missionary minister to Fuzhou, Fujian. He was ordained a priest at St John's Cathedral, Hong Kong, in 1863.   

Wolfe spent the rest of his life in Fuzhou until his death in 1915. He is described as "the chief instrument in the remarkable ingathering in the Fuh-kien Province." He was made Archdeacon of Fuzhou in 1887 and Vice-President of the CMS in 1910. He was the first and only Vice-President not to be a Bishop.

After his death, the Synod in Fuzhou, with both Chinese and European members decided to commemorate his life and work by building a cathedral in his memory. Christ Church Cathedral (Cangxia Church) was opened in 1927. The duilian (Antithetical_couplet) running down the left hand side of the entrance translates as "With the ancient moon shining upon modern men we commemorate Archdeacon Wolfe who ministered here." Wolfe's name in Chinese sounded very like ancient moon and this became the nickname of one who was also known as 'The Fukien Moses'. He is still remembered by name in Fukien by many present day congregations.  

Wolfe translated a number of works into the local dialect including the Book of Common Prayer, several catechisms, the Gospel of St Matthew, and the Book of Joshua. He was responsible for the building of a number of churches and schools in Fuzhou and other centres across Fukien.

In 1864 Wolfe married Mary Ann Maclehose in Hong Kong. She predeceased him in 1913. Of their family of three boys and three girls, the girls Minnie, Annie and Amy all became missionaries and served in Fuzhou. His son Charles received medical training and worked in hospitals in the city.

References

Further reading
 J. R. Wolfe, Annual Letters and other correspondence in the Archives of the Church Missionary Society, Cadbury Research Library: Special Collections, University of Birmingham.

Irish Anglican missionaries
1832 births
1915 deaths
People from County Cork
Anglican missionaries in China